{{safesubst:#invoke:RfD|||month = March
|day = 17
|year = 2023
|time = 01:17
|timestamp = 20230317011713

|content=
REDIRECT Abiogenesis

}}